Korean War Museum may refer to:

Memorial of the War to Resist US Aggression and Aid Korea, China
Victorious War Museum, North Korea
War Memorial of Korea, South Korea
Korean War National Museum (defunct), United States

See also
Korean War Veterans Memorial, United States
North Korea Peace Museum
Sinchon Museum of American War Atrocities, North Korea